The National Museum of Australian Pottery is located in the town of Holbrook, New South Wales. It holds over 2000 pieces of domestic Australian pottery made in the 19th and early 20th centuries. The pieces in the collection were made by more than 130 Australian potteries and includes items such as tea pots, jugs, water filters, spruce and ginger beer bottles, along with a large variety of colourful and decorative pieces.

The museum includes work by the convict potter, Jonathon Leak (1777-1838). Leak's pieces are the earliest marked pieces of Australian pottery. Many of the Leak pieces on display were recovered from a clay pit in Sydney during an archaeological dig in 2007.

The museum opened in Wodonga, Victoria in 1995, and moved to Holbrook in 2006. The museum building was originally a large department store built in 1910 for A. H. Mackie and Company. The owners and directors of the museum are Geoff and Kerrie Ford, who have been awarded the Order of Australia Medal for "service to the arts, particularly the study of early Australian pottery, and to the community." Ford has written several book on Australian pottery, including Australian Pottery: The first 100 years (1995), the Encyclopaedia of Australian Potter's Marks (1998) and Convict Potters of Australia 1821 to 1851 (2001).

The National Museum of Australian Pottery also has an ongoing program of short-term exhibitions.

References

External links
 National Museum of Australian Pottery website
 ABC interview with Geoff and Kerrie Ford

Ceramics museums
Art museums and galleries in New South Wales